Batocera is a genus of the family Cerambycidae, subfamily Lamiinae, close to the genus Rosenbergia.

List of the described species with their distribution
 Batocera aeneonigra Thomson, 1859 New Guinea, Moluccas, Timor and Key Islands.
 Batocera ammiralis Breuning, 1947 Admiralty Islands.
 Batocera andamana Thomson, 1878 Andaman Islands. Common.
 Batocera armata (Olivier, 1800) Moluccas, New Guinea.
 Batocera boisduvali (Hope, 1839) Australia.
 Batocera breuningi Gilmour & Dibb, 1948 Tonkin. Very rare.
 Batocera browni Bates, 1877 New Hanover, New Ireland, Duke of York Island. Very rare.
 Batocera bruyni Lansborough, 1880 Sangihe.
 Batocera celebiana Thomson, 1858 Celebes, Moluccas, Java, Sanihe. Very common.
 Batocera celebiana ssp. pierrotae Rigout, 1994
 Batocera cinnamonea Pascoe, 1866 Sula Islands.
 Batocera davidis Fairmaire, 1878 Formosa (Taiwan), China, Yunnan, Tonkin.
 Batocera enganensis Gahan, 1907 Engano, Sumatra.
 Batocera forbesii (Waterhouse, 1881 Sumatra.
 Batocera frenchi Van de Poll, 1886 Australia: Queensland.
 Batocera gerstaeckerii Thomson, 1865 Sula Island.
 Batocera gigas Drapiez, 1819 Java. Very common.
 Batocera herbuloti (Devecis, 1993) Borneo.
 Batocera hercules Boisduval, 1835 Celebes, Ambon, Java, Philippines.
 Batocera hlaveki Rigout, 1988 Maprik, New Guinea. Only some specimens known.
 Batocera horsfieldi (Hope, 1839) China, Himalayas.
 Batocera humeridens Thomson, 1859 Timor, Flores, Moa and Allor Islands.
 Batocera inconspicua Van de Poll, 1890 New Guinea, Solomon Islands: Bougainville, Guadalcanal.
 Batocera itzingeri (Breuning, 1942) Sumatra, Malaysia
 Batocera kibleri Schwarzer, 1925 Solomon Islands (Bougainville). Very common.
 Batocera laena Thomson, 1858 New Guinea, Key and Aru Islands, New Britain.
 Batocera lamondi Rigout, 1987 Malaita Island.
 Batocera lethuauti Schmitt & Le Thuaut, 2000 Sumba Island.
 Batocera lineolata Chevrolat, 1852 Japan, China. Very common.
 Batocera maculata (Schönherr, 1817) Thailand, Sumatra, Java, Borneo. Very common.
 Batocera magica Thomson, 1859 Java, Philippines. Common.
 Batocera malleti Schmitt, 2000 Laos.
 Batocera matzdorffi Kriesche 1915 New Guinea.
 Batocera migsominea Gilmour & Dibb, 1948 Tonkin.
 Batocera molitor Kriesche, 1915 Eastern India, Philippines, Java, Sumatra, Celebes, Tonkin, Laos. Very common.
 Batocera nebulosa Bates, 1877 Duke of York Island, New Britain, New Ireland.
 Batocera numitor Newman, 1842 Eastern India, Philippines, Java, Sumatra, Celebes, Tonkin. Very common.
 Batocera oceanica Schwarzer, 1914 Palau Island (South Carolina Islands). rare.
 Batocera parryi (Hope, 1845) Himalayas, Tonkin, Sumatra, Java, Borneo. Common.
 Batocera porioni Rigout, 1987 Solomon archipelago: Makira Island (San Cristobal).
 Batocera rosenbergi Kaup, 1866 Flores, Sumbawa, Lomblen.
 Batocera roylei Hope, 1833 Himalayas, Tonkin, Sabah (Borneo)
 Batocera rubus (Linnaeus, 1758) India, China, Korea, Tonkin, Malaysia, Sumatra, Java, Borneo, Philippines. Very common. Many varieties described
 Batocera rufomaculata (De Geer, 1775) West coast of Africa to India. Exists also in the West Indies, and also discovered in Syria. Very common.
 Batocera saundersii (Pascoe, 1866) Malaysia, Sumatra.

 Batocera strandi Breuning, 1954 Celebes (Tindano). Very rare.
 Batocera sumbaensis Franz, 1972 Sumba Island.
 Batocera thomsoni Javet, 1858 Malaysia, Java, Boeneo. Very common.
 Batocera timorlautensis Heller, 1897 Timorlaut Island. Very rare.
 Batocera una White, 1858 Vuana Lava (New Hebrides). Only three specimens known.
 Batocera ushijimai N. Ohbayashi, 1981 Taiwan.
 Batocera victoriana Thomson, 1856 Borneo, Sumatra, Tonkin, Malaysia. Very common.
 Batocera wallacei Thomson, 1858 New Guinea, Aru Island, Key Island, Cape York. Very common.
 Batocera woodlarkiana Montrouzier, 1855 Woodlark Island. Rare.
 Batocera wyliei Chevrolat, 1858 Gabon, Congo (Zaïre), Cameroon, Angola, Guinea,
 Batocera wyliei ssp. granulipennis Breuning, 1948 Ivory Coast.

Species incertae sedis
 Batocera chevrolati Thomson, 1859
 Batocera claudia Pascoe, 1866
 Batocera drapiezi Aurivillius, 1922
 Batocera punctata Schwarzer, 1925
 Batocera sentis (Linnaeus, 1758)

Bibliography
 Breuning (S. von), 1950 - Lamiaires nouveaux de la collection Lepesme, Longicornia, 1, pp. 518–519
 Gilmour (E. F.) & Dibb (J. R.), 1948 - Revision of the Batocerini (Col., Cerambycidae, Lamiinae), Spolia Zeylanica, 25(1), pp. 1–121, pl. 1-10
 Kriesche (R.), 1915 - Die Gattung Batocera Cast., Archiv für Naturgeschichte, 80, Abt. A, 11, pp. 111–150
 Rigout (J.), 1981 - The Beetles of the World, volume 1, Batocerini I,  Sciences Nat, Venette 
 Rigout (J.), 1982 - The Beetles of the World, volume 2, Batocerini II, Sciences Nat, Venette 
 Rigout (J.), 1987, Description d'un nouveau Batocera, Bulletin de la Société des Sciences Naturelles, 54, p. 26
 Rigout (J.), 1987, Description d'un Batocera nouveau, Bulletin de la Société des Sciences Naturelles, 55, p. 10
 Perger (R.) & Vitali (F.), 2012, Revision of the genus Megacriodes Pascoe, 1866, a new synonym of Batocera Laporte de Castelnau, 1840 (Coleoptera, Cerambycidae, Lamiinae), Les Cahiers Magellanes (NS), 7, pp. 1–17, 31 figs.

External links
 Video of Batocera in Thailand

Batocerini
Cerambycidae genera